In enzymology, a (iso)eugenol O-methyltransferase is an enzyme that catalyzes the chemical reaction

S-adenosyl-L-methionine + isoeugenol  S-adenosyl-L-homocysteine + isomethyleugenol

Thus, the two substrates of this enzyme are S-adenosyl methionine and isoeugenol, whereas its two products are S-adenosylhomocysteine and isomethyleugenol.

This enzyme belongs to the family of transferases, specifically those transferring one-carbon group methyltransferases.  The systematic name of this enzyme class is S-adenosyl-L-methionine:isoeugenol O-methyltransferase.

References

 
 

EC 2.1.1
Enzymes of unknown structure